The Commodore Isaac Hull Bridge carries Connecticut Route 8 over the Housatonic River, between Shelton and Derby, in Connecticut.
The bridge was constructed in 1951 for Route 8.
This deck-truss bridge, originally built in 1951 and named in honor of Commodore Isaac Hull who was born in Shelton. The bridge was widened during the 1980s to accommodate increased traffic with the completion of the Route 8 Expressway.  This work was completed in 1990.

The deck-truss design is similar to that of the I-35W bridge in Minnesota that collapsed.  Because of this, ConnDOT conducted an inspection on the Commodore Hull Bridge, and similar bridges throughout the state following the collapse.  The bridge has recently been rated as "structurally deficient" and ConnDOT has completed its 2016-drafted plan. to rehabilitate the bridge's superstructure in early 2019.

See also
List of crossings of the Housatonic River

References

External links
Housatonic River Bridge (#571A) gives dimensions for this bridge
Ansonia-Derby-Shelton Expressway and Commodore Isaac Hull Bridge across the Housatonic River
Aerial view of Shelton and Derby along the Housatonic River with the Commodore Isaac Hull Bridge and Ansonia-Derby-Shelton Expressway drawn onto the photograph
Commodore Hull Bridge - Housatonic River

Buildings and structures in Derby, Connecticut
Buildings and structures in Shelton, Connecticut
Bridges completed in 1951
Bridges in Fairfield County, Connecticut
Bridges in New Haven County, Connecticut
Road bridges in Connecticut
Bridges over the Housatonic River
Steel bridges in the United States
1951 establishments in Connecticut